The Treaty of 1752 was a treaty signed between the Mi'kmaq people of Shubenacadie, Nova Scotia and the governor of Nova Scotia on 22 November 1752 during Father Le Loutre's War.  The treaty was created by Edward Cornwallis and later signed by Jean-Baptiste Cope and Governor Peregrine Hopson. Cornwallis was at the signing at Cope's request.

Legal invocation
In 1928, Mr. Gabriel Sylliboy was the first to invoke the Treaty of 1752 in the courts (R. v. Sylliboy).  He was Mi’kmaq Grand Chief.  He was charged in Inverness County, Cape Breton, with possession of muskrat and fox pelts, in violation of the provincial Lands and Forests Act. The judge claimed that the 1752 treaty only applied to a small band of Mi’kmaq at Shubenacadie, located in central Nova Scotia, and therefore did not apply to Syliboy who was from the Whycocomagh Reserve in Cape Breton.

In 1985, Mr. Simon from Shubenacadie invoked the Treaty of 1752 in the courts (R. v. Simon). The courts reported that the treaty protected hunting rights for those from Shubenacadie.  The court also indicated that there was not enough evidence uncovered at that time to determine if the treaty was terminated by subsequent hostilities. The court did not countenance any aboriginal rights to hunt and fish commercially.

In August 1993, in Antigonish, Donald Marshall, Jr. (who was from Cape Breton) caught 463 pounds of eels and sold them for $800 as part of a commercial fishery. He was violating federal laws by fishing without a licence in a closed season with illegal nets. Initially, Marshall's lawyer relied solely on the Treaty of 1752.

The Crown's expert historian Stephen Patterson dismantled the validity of the Treaty of 1752 that was used to support Marshall's case.  Dr. Patterson indicated that the treaty did not apply to Mi’kmaq people outside of Shubenacadie and that the treaty was terminated by subsequent hostilities. (Chief Cope renounced and destroyed the Treaty himself six months after signing it.) Marshall's lawyers abandoned his reliance upon the Treaty of 1752, and switched his focus to the Halifax Treaties of 1760-61.

See also 
Treaty Day (Nova Scotia)
Military history of Nova Scotia
Military history of the Mi’kmaq People
 Treaty of Portsmouth (1713)
Treaty of Casco (1678)
Treaty of Watertown
 Halifax Treaties

References 

Texts

External links 
 
 

1752 treaties
1752 in Nova Scotia
Pre-Confederation Nova Scotia
Monuments and memorials in Nova Scotia
Mi'kmaq in Canada
Father Le Loutre's War